The Northern Region is one of five regions of Malta. The region includes the northwestern part of the main island of Malta. The region borders the Central and Southern Regions, and is also close to Gozo Region.

It was created by the Act No. XVI of 2009 out of part of Malta Majjistral.

Subdivision

Districts
Northern Region includes the entire Northern District and parts of the Northern Harbour District and Western Districts.

Local councils
Northern Region includes 12 local councils:
Dingli - include the areas of Buskett and Dingli Cliffs 
Għargħur - include the area of Xwieki 
Mdina (Città Notabile)
Mellieħa - include the areas of Ċirkewwa, Marfa, Armier Bay, Għadira, Manikata, Golden Bay, Santa Maria Estate, Paradise Bay, Anchor Bay (Popeye Village), Ta' Pennellu, Mġiebaħ, and Selmun Palace and Selmunett. 
Mġarr - include the areas of Żebbiegħ, Ġnejna Bay, Binġemma, Ta' Mrejnu, Għajn Tuffieħa, Ballut, Lippija, Santi, Fomm ir-Riħ, Abatija and Mselliet. 
Mosta - include the areas of Bidnija, Blata l-Għolja, Santa Margarita, Tarġa Gap, Ta' Żokkrija and Ta' Mlit
Mtarfa
Naxxar - include the areas of Baħar iċ-Ċagħaq, Salna, Magħtab, Birguma, Sgħajtar, San Pawl tat-Tarġa and Simblija
Pembroke - include the areas of St. Andrew's, St. Patrick's and White Rocks
Rabat - include the areas of Baħrija, Tal-Virtù, Mtaħleb, Kunċizzjoni, Bieb ir-Ruwa and Għar Barka
St. Paul's Bay - include the areas of Burmarrad, Buġibba, Qawra, Xemxija, Wardija, Pwales, San Martin, Mbordin and San Pawl Milqi and part of Bidnija
Swieqi - include the areas of Madliena, Ibraġ, Victoria Gardens and High Ridge

Hamlets
Baħar iċ-Ċagħaq
Baħrija
Burmarrad
Madliena
Tal-Virtù

Regional Committee
The current Northern Regional Committee is made up of:

References

Regions of Malta
States and territories established in 2009
2009 establishments in Malta